Turbonilla coomansi is a species of sea snail, a marine gastropod mollusk in the family Pyramidellidae, the pyrams and their allies.

Distribution
This marine species occurs in the following locations at depths between 0 m and 538 m:
 Caribbean Sea : Colombia, Costa Rica, Jamaica
 Gulf of Mexico: Louisiana, Texas
 Atlantic Ocean : Brazil

References

 Adams, C. B. 1850. Descriptions of supposed new species of marine shells, which inhabit Jamaica. Contributions to Conchology 5: 69-75.
 Bush, K. J. 1899. Descriptions of new species of Turbonilla of the Western Atlantic fauna, with notes on those previously known. Proceedings of the Academy of Natural Sciences of Philadelphia 51: 145-177, pl. 8.

External links
 To Encyclopedia of Life
 To ITIS
 To World Register of Marine Species

coomansi
Gastropods described in 1994